Reinirus Wilhelmus Antonius Notten (20 November 1949 – 22 August 1995) was a Dutch footballer and manager who last worked as head coach of the Aruba national football team. He made five appearances for the Netherlands national team between 1974 and 1975.

Career
Notten started his managerial career in 1992 with Emmen in the Dutch Eerste Divisie, a position he held until 1994. After that, he coached the Aruba national football team.

References

External links
 More adventurer than success song
 René Notten (45) was an adventurer among the football coaches
 RENÉ NOTTEN 1950–1995; Adventurer
 Top 65 clubiconen: René Notten
 The big right of the duo Co Adriaanse – Rene Notten

1949 births
1995 deaths
Sportspeople from Hengelo
Dutch football managers
Dutch footballers
AFC Ajax players
FC Twente players
Feyenoord players
FC Dordrecht players
1. FC Bocholt players
PEC Zwolle players
De Graafschap players
K.R.C. Zuid-West-Vlaanderen players
Association football midfielders
Netherlands international footballers
Dutch expatriate footballers
Dutch expatriate sportspeople in Germany
Expatriate footballers in Germany
Dutch expatriate sportspeople in Belgium
Expatriate footballers in Belgium
Dutch expatriate football managers
Footballers from Overijssel